Deng, also known as Denka, is a sky, rain, and fertility god in Dinka mythology for the Dinka people of Sudan and South Sudan. He is the son of the goddess Abuk.

Among the Nuer, Deng is considered to be "a foreign deity" and "a bringer of disease". His daughter is the moon goddess. In Dinka religion, he is a storm and fertility god bringing lightning, rain, and thunder.
The word deng means "rain" in Thuɔŋjäŋ. 

Among his followers, Deng is regarded as the intermediary between humans and the supreme being. Closely linked with the supreme god Nhialic, he was regarded as the son of god and sometimes as the son of the goddess Abuk. In some areas of Dinka country, Deng and Nhialic are "regarded as one and the same".

References

External links
Lady of the Earth 

African gods
Dinka mythology
Fertility gods
Nuer mythology
Rain deities
Sky and weather gods